"Garam shah lā garam shah" was the national anthem of Afghanistan from 1978 to 1992, during the period of one-party socialist rule.

History 
Its lyrics were written by Sulaiman Laiq on behalf of the government of the People's Democratic Party of Afghanistan (PDPA) headed by Nur Muhammad Taraki, who decided to change the national symbols after the Saur Revolution of 1978. The music was composed by Jalīl Ghahlānd and was arranged by Ustad Salim Sarmad. Like many national anthems, it was sometimes sung abbreviated with only the chorus and the first stanza. In 1987, Afghanistan officially abandoned communism but this song was kept as the national anthem until 1992, when it was discontinued.

Lyrics
The national anthem consisted of three stanzas and refrains, beginning with the refrain. On many occasions, just the first chorus and verse is performed.

Pashto original

English translation
Chorus:
Ardent and hotter become,
Thou Sun holy and marvelous.
Thou art our Sun of freedom,
O Sun of destiny lustrous.

Through the harsh storms we traversed,
The end of a road we reached.
Through a dismal past we trekked,
Yet toward light we advanced,
Thus to victory we marched,
And to kinship we triumphed.

Chorus

Our land renewed and sage
In the workers' hands at last.
Lions sacred in this age
Brought down to peasants steadfast.
Now in the labourers' age,
The era of tyrants passed.

Chorus

For peace and fraternity
Among proletarians;
For freedom and democracy
To the faithful labourers.
To the sworn community,
We request for victuals.

See also 

 List of historical national anthems
 Afghan National Anthem

References

External links 
 Garam shah lā garam shah instrumental in MP3 format
 Garam shah lā garam shah instrumental in MIDI format
 Sheet music of the anthem
Video with the 1978–1980 flag
 Video with the 1980–1987 flag; another video with the 1987–1992 one

Afghan songs
National symbols of Afghanistan
Asian anthems
Historical national anthems
National anthem compositions in E-flat major
Pashto-language songs